Berne is an unincorporated community in Milton Township, Dodge County, Minnesota, United States.  The community is located near the junction of State Highway 57 (MN 57) and Dodge County Road 24.  The Middle Fork of the Zumbro River flows nearby.

The community is located north of Mantorville, west of Pine Island, east of West Concord, and south of Wanamingo.

Berne is located within ZIP code 55985 based in West Concord.

History
A post office called Berne was established in 1858, and remained in operation until 1902. The community was named after Bern, in Switzerland.

References

Unincorporated communities in Dodge County, Minnesota
Unincorporated communities in Minnesota